Tora Mosterstong—also known as Thora Mostaff—was one of Harald Fairhair's concubines and the mother of Håkon the Good; Harald Fairhair's youngest son and the third King of Norway (c. 935–961).

According to Snorri Sturluson's Saga of Harald Fairhair (Soga om Harald Hårfagre), Tora was from the island of Moster and was descended from the clan (ætt) of Horda-Kåre  (Hǫrða-Kára) :

«When king Harald was nigh on 70 years old, he had a son with a woman named Tora and was called Mosterstang, her clan was from Moster, and she had good friends, she was related to Horda-Kåre. She was a steady woman and very beautiful; she was counted the king's servant. There were many then who served the king, though they were of good lineage, both men and women. As concerns the children of goodfolk, it was custom to mind well who would ladle water over them and give them their name.

When the time approached that Tora expected to give birth to the child, she wanted to travel to king Harald, he was north on Seim, and she was on Moster. She sailed north on Sigurd jarl's ship. They put ashore for the night, and there Tora gave birth to her child up on the slate by the gangplank; it was a boy. Sigurd jarl ladled water over the boy and named him for his own father Håkon Ladejarl; the boy soon grew beautiful and large of body and looked much like his father. Harald let the boy follow his mother, and the two were at the king's farms while the boy was small.»

Snorri consistently speaks of Tora as concubine and maidservant, which tends to produce the wrong connotations. Horda-Kåre was one of Harald Fairhair's old allies, and held high office  at the Battle of Hafrsfjord. When Tora had a place with the king, it must have been part of a conscious policy to keep the two clans close.

References

Primary Source
Snorri Sturluson  Soga om Harald Hårfagre  (Det Norske Samlaget. 1979)

Mistresses of Norwegian royalty
Fairhair dynasty
9th-century Norwegian women
10th-century Norwegian women
Concubines